There are three species of European red wood ant in the genus Formica:

Formica polyctena
Formica pratensis
 Formica rufa